Suttas from the Sutta Pitaka of the Pali Canon.

 List of Digha Nikaya suttas
 List of Majjhima Nikaya suttas
 List of Samyutta Nikaya suttas
 List of Anguttara Nikaya suttas
 List of Khuddaka Nikaya suttas

See also
 Buddhist texts
 Index of Buddhism-related articles
 List of sutras
 Mahayana sutras

Sutta Pitaka
Suttas